Charles Kristian Bonnycastle Bruun (born October 25, 1979) is a Canadian actor. He is best known for his roles in Orphan Black, Murdoch Mysteries, and The Recruit.

Life and career
Bruun was born on October 25, 1979, in Toronto, Ontario, Canada, where he was raised. He attended Valley Forge Military Academy in Pennsylvania from 1994 to 1997, followed by Queen's University in Kingston, Ontario for a B.A. in drama, graduating in 2001. He also studied at the George Brown Theatre School in Toronto and with David Rotenberg at the Professional Actors Lab.

His first screen role was in the film Good Morning Tomorrow in 2003, playing a bartender. He went on to take other roles including a Lead Officer in Nikita, Stu in Blood Pressure and Alec in Play the Film. He had an ongoing role in Murdoch Mysteries, playing Constable Slugger Jackson from 2012 to 2017, for seasons 6 through 11. His most famous role has been in the award-winning Canadian science fiction series Orphan Black, playing Donnie Hendrix, the husband of one of the main characters, Alison Hendrix. His role became larger in the third season compared to the previous two, as he became a member of the main cast.

Filmography

Film

Television

Podcasts

References

External links

 
 
 

Living people
21st-century Canadian male actors
Male actors from Toronto
Canadian male film actors
Canadian male television actors
Queen's University at Kingston alumni
Canadian people of Finnish descent
Canadian people of German descent
1979 births